Dan Trueman is a composer, fiddle player, improviser, new instrument creator and software designer. He plays the violin and the Norwegian Hardanger fiddle. Trueman studied physics at Carleton College in Northfield, Minnesota, composition and theory at the University of Cincinnati College-Conservatory of Music in Cincinnati and composition at Princeton University. He taught composition at Columbia, Colgate, and since 2002, at Princeton. As a performer, Trueman has played at both contemporary and folk music festivals, among them Bang on a Can and Den Norske Folkemusikkveka. Trueman has written for his own ensembles, Interface (which also includes Curtis Bahn and Tomie Hahn) and the Princeton Laptop Orchestra (also known as PLOrk, which he co-founded with Perry Cook), as well as the Brentano, Daedalus, Cassatt and Amernet string quartets, Non Sequitur, So Percussion and others. He has received awards from the Guggenheim (2006) and MacArthur Foundations (2008 Digital Media and Learning Award).

Discography
Trollstilt, Trollstilt, Azalea City Records, 2000
./swank, interface, c74 Records, 2001
Machine Language, Bridge Records, 2004
Five (and-a-half) Gardens, So Percussion and Trollstilt, New Amsterdam Records, 2008
Unpacking the Trailer, QQQ, New Amsterdam Records, 2009
CrissCross (with Brittany Haas), Many Arrows Music, 2012
Neither Anvil Nor Pulley, So Percussion, Cantaloupe Music, 2013
Laghdú (with  Caoimhín Ó Raghallaigh), IrishMusic.net Records, 2014

External links

http://qqqmusic.org
http://trollstilt.org
http://www.arts.rpi.edu/crb/interface/
http://plork.cs.princeton.edu/

Notes

Living people
Carleton College alumni
University of Cincinnati – College-Conservatory of Music alumni
Princeton University alumni
Columbia University faculty
Colgate University faculty
Princeton University faculty
Year of birth missing (living people)